Sumbul Shahid (1954 – 6 May 2021) was a Pakistani actress, singer, and host. She was the daughter of Ahmad Bashir (Urdu: احمد بشیر; March 24, 1923 – December 25, 2004) a writer, journalist, intellectual, and film director from Pakistan  She was known for her roles in the dramas Takkay Ki Ayegi Baraat, Pani Jaisa Piyar, Dekho Chaand Aaya, Ishqaaway, and Nand.

Early life
Sumbul was born in 1954 in Karachi, Pakistan. She completed her studies at the University of Karachi.

Career
She made her debut as an actress on PTV in the 1990s. She was noted for her roles in the dramas Aeteraaf, Parchaiyan, Happily Married, Yeh Shadi Nahi Ho Sakti,	and Nazdeekiyan. She also appeared in the dramas Malika-e-Aliya, Takkay Ki Ayegi Baraat, Daagh, Faltu Larki, and Meri Behan Meri Dewrani. Since then she appeared in the dramas Ishqaaway, Pani Jaisa Piyar, Dekho Chaand Aaya, Aik Aur Sitam Hai, and Nand.

Personal life
Sumbul was married to Shahid and had two sons. Her father Ahmad Bashir was a writer and film director. Sumbul's son Shiraz Nasir died in 2019. Sumbul's younger sisters Bushra Ansari and Asma Abbas are actresses and her elder sister Neelam is a writer.

Death
She was diagnosed with COVID-19 during the COVID-19 pandemic in Pakistan. She died on May 6, 2021, in Lahore.

Filmography

Television

Telefilm

Awards and nominations
 Best Actress Award in 2019 by the Arts Council of Pakistan

References

External links
 

1954 births
20th-century Pakistani women singers
2021 deaths
Actresses from Karachi
20th-century Pakistani actresses
Pakistani television actresses
21st-century Pakistani actresses
Deaths from the COVID-19 pandemic in Punjab, Pakistan
University of Karachi alumni
Pakistani film actresses
21st-century Pakistani women singers
Pakistani women singers